The Mirax Residential Complex is a group of buildings currently under construction in Kyiv, the capital of Ukraine. It is located in the central Podilskyi district at 43, Hlybochytska St. The complex consists of seven buildings, including a 28-story skyscraper

History
An initial architectural concept was developed in 2005, it envisioned a mixed use office and residential complex called Capital Center, consisting of a 3-story shopping mall, 22 story residential part and 45 story office building, which at 172 meters would have been the highest in Ukraine.

Construction began on December 22, 2006, by Russian company Mirax Group. The initial plan was changed into twin 46 story towers which were supposed to reach 192 meters, called Mirax Plaza Business Center and was initially expected to be completed by 2010. Due to the financial crisis of 2007-2009, the construction was put on hold. In May 2009 it was reported that Mirax Group had been in negotiations with another Russian corporation to sell the project. Some six months later, AEON Corporation acquired the share in the project and announced plans to correct the existing concept and commence construction in the autumn of 2010. By February 2010, only 11 floors of the first tower had been constructed.

In 2016 the abandoned construction site was taken over by the municipal company Kyivmiskbud due to skyrocketing debt. The project was scaled down to single tower, cut down to almost just half of the originally projected height, a mere 28 floors and six smaller buildings, ranging between 8 and 23 floors. The tower was topped out in 2020 and the entire complex should be completed by 2022.

See also
 List of tallest buildings in Europe

References

External links
  ЖК - «Mirax» Official website (in Ukrainian)
 
 

Buildings and structures in Kyiv
Skyscrapers in Ukraine
Residential buildings in Ukraine
Residential skyscrapers